Tostitos is a brand of Frito-Lay that produces different tortilla chips and a range of accompanying dips.

Varieties 
There are many varieties of Tostitos chips:

 Tostitos Gold (and bite size Gold) - a thicker and larger version of the original, advertised to hold the thickest of dips; the bite size chips are smaller. Initially very popular, this variety has been quietly discontinued.
 Tostitos Hint of Jalapeño - a version with jalapeño pepper flavoring added.
 Tostitos Hint of Lime - a version with lime flavoring added.
 Tostitos Hint of Pepper Jack - a version with pepper jack cheese flavoring added.
 Tostitos Spicy Quesadilla - artificial cheese and other spicy flavors added.
 Tostitos Hint of Multigrain - a version with whole wheats and grains flavoring added.
 Tostitos Flour Tortilla - made with flour (instead of just corn) for a milder flavor for dipping with a broader range of dips beyond Mexican-style dips (salsa, queso/cheese dip, etc.).
 Tostitos Restaurant Style - A much larger triangular style chip, similar to what is used in traditional Mexican-style restaurants. Also available in Light, advertised to be made with olestra, reducing fat and calories.
 Tostitos Scoops - a tortilla chip molded into the shape of a bowl that allows for easier scooping of salsas and dips. Also available in Baked, advertised to have half the fat of normal tostitos scoops. Recently released "Hint Of Jalapeño".
 Tostitos Natural (or "Simply Tostitos") - an organic tortilla chip that advertises "no artificial ingredients". Available in blue corn and yellow corn.
 Tostitos Rounds (and bite size Rounds) - made to be flat and cut in a circle; the bite size chips are smaller.
 Tostitos Rolls - introduced this party staple, a corn tortilla chip, and tube-like shape and hearty crunch.
 Tostitos Cantina - introduced in 2012, a style of restaurant-inspired chips that targets the Millennial generation. There are several varieties of Cantina chips, including Cantina Thin & Crispy, and Cantina Traditional.
Tostitos Salsa Verde

Some Frito-Lay brand seasoned products, including some flavors of Tostitos, contain pork enzymes in addition to herbs, cheese and other seasonings. Frito-Lay's web site states that they use enzymes from pigs (porcine enzymes) in some of their seasoned snack products to develop "unique flavors". The presence of pig-derived ingredients makes them unsuitable for vegetarians, vegans, as well as non-kosher and non-halal.

Fiesta Bowl
Starting in 1995, Tostitos became the title sponsor of the Fiesta Bowl, one of the four American college football games that would make up the Bowl Championship Series, the former unofficial national championship of the Division I Football Bowl Subdivision (formerly Division I-A). The game was played at Sun Devil Stadium in Tempe, Arizona through 2006 before moving to University of Phoenix Stadium in Glendale, Arizona in 2007.

Following the 2006 season, Tostitos was the title sponsor for the BCS National Championship Game, a new game matching the number one and two teams in the final BCS standings. The title sponsor for the championship game rotated depending upon which site is hosting the 1 vs. 2 matchup.

On June 9, 2014, Frito-Lay withdrew their sponsorship of the Fiesta Bowl citing the higher costs of sponsoring the event through the new College Football Playoff system.

See also 
 Chips and dip
 Walking taco, also known as Tostilocos, after Tostitos; street food from Tijuana.

References

External links

 

Frito-Lay brands
Brand name snack foods
Products introduced in 1979